Photographs is the ninth album and the seventh studio album by Casiopea, recorded and released in 1983.

Track listing

Personnel
CASIOPEA are
Issei Noro - Electric guitar (Yamaha SG-2000, SG-1000 Fretless), Electric acoustic guitar, Sitar, Amdeck Percussion Synthesizer, Prophet-10, Linn LM-1, Vocal (A2, B2)
Minoru Mukaiya - Keyboards (Yamaha GS-1, DX-9, CS-70M, CP-35, Moog the SOURCE, Roland VP-330, Prophet-10, Oberheim OB-Xa, Emulator, Linn LM-1)
Tetsuo Sakurai - Electric Bass (Yamaha BB-2000 Milk Bass, Kramer DMZ-6000B), Vocal (B2)
Akira Jimbo - Drums (Yamaha YD-9000 RG), Percussion, Amdeck Percussion Synthesizer, Linn LM-1

Production
 Producer - Shunsuke Miyazumi, Issei Noro
Recording Engineer - Norio Yoshizawa
Assistant Engineer - Shinji Miyoshi
Re-mixed - Norio Yoshizawa, Issei Noro
Mastering - Mituharu Kobayashi
Art Direction - Kaoru Watanabe
Cover design - Kaoru Watanabe, Hiroyasu Yoshioka, Katsunori Hironaka
Photographer - Kohei Onishi
Stylist - Makiko Nakamura
Hair and Make Up - Mitzi(JET)
Remastering engineer - Kouji Suzuki (2016)

Release history

External links

References

1983 albums
Casiopea albums
Alfa Records albums